Space is the Place is an album by Sun Ra and His Intergalactic Solar Arkestra.  The music was recorded in early 1972 in San Francisco, California for the film Space Is the Place.  However, the music remained unreleased until Evidence Music issued a compact disc in 1993.

During the late-1960s and early-1970s, Sun Ra and his ensemble made several forays to California.  In 1971, Sun Ra taught a course, "The Black Man in the Cosmos," at University of California, Berkeley.  Over the course of these California visits, Sun Ra came to the attention of Jim Newman, who produced the film Space Is the Place starring Sun Ra and his Arkestra, and based, in part, on Sun Ra's Berkeley lectures.  The soundtrack CD compiles 16 tracks that Sun Ra recorded for the film.

Critical reception 
The Penguin Guide to Jazz describes the album as "a brisk montage of Arkestra music....[I]t works remarkably well and the playing is tight and enigmatic."  The Penguin editors also note that "Mysterious Crystal" is of particular interest, with the track "combining a huge array of elements into something that simply cannot be characterized by reference to any other music."  Ron Wynn of Allmusic describes the tracks as being "among Sun Ra's most ambitious, unorthodox, and compelling compositions."

Track listing 
All compositions and arrangements by Sun Ra.
 "It's After the End of the World" – 3:25
 "Under Different Stars" – 3:55
 "Discipline 33" – 3:22
 "Watusa" – 7:11
 "Calling Planet Earth" – 3:04
 "I Am the Alter-Destiny" – 1:08
 "Satellites Are Spinning" – 2:33
 "Cosmic Forces" – 3:09
 "Outer Spaceways Incorporated"– 3:00
 "We Travel the Spaceways" – 2:28
 "The Overseer" – 3:04
 "Blackman/Love in Outer Space" – 16:53
 "Mysterious Crystal" – 5:53
 "I Am the Brother of the Wind" – 5:54
 "We'll Wait for You" – 4:11
 "Space Is the Place" – 4:23

Personnel 
 Sun Ra – piano, Minimoog, Farfisa organ, Clavinet, Rocksichord, declamation
 Kwame Hadi – trumpet, conga, vibraphone
 Wayne Harris – trumpet
 Marshall Allen – alto saxophone, flute, oboe, bassoon, kora, cowbell, percussion
 Danny Davis – alto saxophone, flute, bass clarinet, percussion
 Larry Northington – alto saxophone, conga, percussion
 John Gilmore – tenor saxophone, drums, percussion, vocals
 Eloe Omoe – bass clarinet, bongos, percussion
 Danny Ray Thompson – baritone saxophone, percussion
 Lex Humphries – drums
 Ken Moshesh – conga
 June Tyson – vocals, bells

Release history

References

Sun Ra albums
1993 soundtrack albums
Evidence Music soundtracks
Science fiction film soundtracks